Overton railway station serves the village of Overton in Hampshire, England. It is located in the hamlet of Quidhampton.

The station is served and managed by South Western Railway.

Services
South Western Railway operates an hourly service (with peak extras) between London Waterloo and Salisbury with limited extensions to Bristol Temple Meads, Exeter St Davids and Yeovil Pen Mill. Services call every two hours each way on Sundays, terminating eastbound at Reading instead of Basingstoke (which is the usual Monday to Saturday terminus).

External links
South Western Railway

References

Railway stations in Hampshire
Railway stations in Great Britain opened in 1854
Former London and South Western Railway stations
Railway stations served by South Western Railway
DfT Category E stations